Elections were held in the Australian state of Victoria on Saturday 18 June 1955 to elect 17 of the 34 members of the state's Legislative Council for six year terms. MLCs were elected in single-member provinces using preferential voting.

Results

Legislative Council

|}

Retiring Members

Country
George Tuckett MLC (Northern)

Candidates
Sitting members are shown in bold text. Successful candidates are highlighted in the relevant colour. Where there is possible confusion, an asterisk (*) is also used.

Results by province

Ballarat

Bendigo

Doutta Galla

East Yarra 

 Two party preferred vote was estimated.

Gippsland

Higinbotham

Melbourne

Melbourne North 

 Preferences were not distributed.

Melbourne West 

 Sitting MLC Les Coleman was elected in 1949 as a Labor member, but defected to Anti-Communist Labor in the 1955 split.

Monash

Northern 

 Preferences were not fully distributed.

North-Eastern

North Western

Southern 

 Two party preferred vote was estimated.

South Eastern 

 Charles Gartside had been elected as a Liberal party MLC in 1949, but was expelled from the party in 1952.

South Western 

 Two party preferred vote was estimated.

Western 

 Hugh MacLeod had been elected as a Liberal party MLC in 1949, but was expelled from the party in 1952.

See also
1955 Victorian state election

References

1955 elections in Australia
Elections in Victoria (Australia)
Results of Victorian state elections
1950s in Victoria (Australia)
June 1955 events in Australia